This is a list of electricity-generating power stations in the U.S. state of Georgia, sorted by type and name. In 2020, Georgia had a total summer capacity of 37,279 MW through all of its power plants, and a net generation of 120,126 GWh. The corresponding electrical energy generation mix in 2021 was 46.3% natural gas, 26.8% nuclear, 15.6% coal, 4.5% biomass, 3.3% hydroelectric, 3.8% solar, and 0.2% petroleum.

Two new nuclear reactors are under construction at the Vogtle Electric Generating Plant. They are the nation's first AP1000 reactors and have planned startup dates in 2023. The state has no active uranium or fossil-fuel mining operations and limited proven reserves of coal.

Nuclear power plants

Fossil-fuel power plants

Coal

Natural Gas

Oil

Renewable power plants
Data from the U.S. Energy Information Administration.

Biomass and municipal waste

Hydroelectric dams

Georgia Power Hydro incorporates 72 hydroelectric generating units to produce a generation capacity of 844,720 kilowatts (kW).

 electricity is generated in Alabama
 Carters, Russell, and Wallace generate additional electricity as reversible pumped storage

Solar photovoltaic

Wind

Georgia had no utility-scale wind generating facilities in 2019.  It has much potential for offshore development and limited onshore potential.

Storage power plants
Data from the U.S. Energy Information Administration.

Batteries

Pumped storage

See also

List of power stations in the United States
List of power stations operated by the Tennessee Valley Authority

References

Georgia
 
Lists of buildings and structures in Georgia (U.S. state)
Energy in Georgia (U.S. state)